Drosera microphylla, the golden rainbow, is an erect perennial tuberous species in the carnivorous plant genus Drosera. It is endemic to Western Australia and grows on granite outcrops or in sandy or laterite soils. It blooms from June to September, displaying its large golden sepals and smaller, variably-coloured petals. In populations near Perth, the petals are red, whereas petal colour near Albany tends to be orange. Some plants east of Esperance have white petals.

D. microphylla was first described and named by Stephan Endlicher in 1837. In 1848, Jules Émile Planchon described the new species D. calycina, which was later reduced to synonymy with D. microphylla. George Bentham described the new variety D. calycina var. minor in 1864. This taxon was also reduced to a synonym of D. microphylla. Lastly, in his 1906 taxonomic monograph of the family Droseraceae, Ludwig Diels also described a new variety, D. microphylla var. macropetala, which was also later reduced to a synonym.

See also
List of Drosera species

References

Carnivorous plants of Australia
Caryophyllales of Australia
Eudicots of Western Australia
Plants described in 1837
microphylla